Ligné may refer to the following places in France:

 Ligné, Charente, a commune in the Charente department
 Ligné, Loire-Atlantique, a commune in the Loire-Atlantique department